ADP-dependent NAD(P)H-hydrate dehydratase ((6S)-β-6-hydroxy-1,4,5,6-tetrahydronicotinamide-adenine-dinucleotide hydro-lyase (ADP-hydrolysing), (6S)-6-β-hydroxy-1,4,5,6-tetrahydronicotinamide-adenine-dinucleotide hydro-lyase (ADP-hydrolysing, NADH-forming)) is an enzyme with systematic name (6S)-6β-hydroxy-1,4,5,6-tetrahydronicotinamide-adenine-dinucleotide hydro-lyase (ADP-hydrolysing; NADH-forming). This enzyme catalyses the following chemical reaction

 (1) ADP + (6S)-6β-hydroxy-1,4,5,6-tetrahydronicotinamide-adenine dinucleotide  AMP + phosphate + NADH
 (2) ADP + (6S)-6β-hydroxy-1,4,5,6-tetrahydronicotinamide-adenine dinucleotide phosphate  AMP + phosphate + NADPH

This enzyme acts equally well on hydrated NADH and hydrated NADPH.

References

External links 
 

EC 4.2.1